An annular solar eclipse took place at the Moon's descending node of the orbit on May 9–10 (UTC), 2013, with a magnitude of 0.9544. A solar eclipse occurs when the Moon passes between Earth and the Sun, thereby totally or partly obscuring the image of the Sun for a viewer on Earth. An annular solar eclipse occurs when the Moon's apparent diameter is smaller than the Sun's, blocking most of the Sun's light and causing the Sun to look like an annulus (ring). An annular eclipse appears as a partial eclipse over a region of the Earth thousands of kilometres wide.

It was the 31st eclipse of the 138th Saros cycle, which began with a partial eclipse on June 6, 1472 and will conclude with a partial eclipse on July 11, 2716.

Visibility 

Annularity was visible from a 171 to 225 kilometre-wide track that traversed Australia, eastern Papua New Guinea, the Solomon Islands, and the Gilbert Islands, with the maximum of 6 minutes 3 seconds visible from the Pacific Ocean east of French Polynesia.

Images

Related eclipses

Eclipses of 2013 
 A partial lunar eclipse on April 25.
 An annular solar eclipse on May 10.
 A penumbral lunar eclipse on May 25.
 A penumbral lunar eclipse on October 18.
 A hybrid solar eclipse on November 3.

Solar eclipses 2011–2014

Saros 138 
It is a part of Saros cycle 138, repeating every 18 years, 11 days, containing 70 events. The series started with partial solar eclipse on June 6, 1472. It contains annular eclipses from August 31, 1598 through February 18, 2482 with a hybrid eclipse on March 1, 2500. It has total eclipses from March 12, 2518 through April 3, 2554. The series ends at member 70 as a partial eclipse on July 11, 2716. The longest duration of totality will be only 56 seconds on April 3, 2554.

Inex series

Tritos series

Metonic cycle

References 

 Photos:
 Cape York Annular Eclipse APOD, 5/11/13
 Partial Solar Eclipse with Airplane APOD, 5/13/13

2013 5 10
2013 5 10
2013 in science
May 2013 events